Chorasmian is a Unicode block containing characters from the Chorasmian script, which was used for writing the Khwarezmian language in Transoxiana during the 8th century.

Block

History
The following Unicode-related documents record the purpose and process of defining specific characters in the Chorasmian block:

References 

Unicode blocks